George Bissett (25 January 1896 – 1946) was a Scottish footballer who played as a forward, most notably for Manchester United and Wolverhampton Wanderers.

Career
Born in Cowdenbeath, Bissett played for Glencraig Thistle and Third Lanark in his native Scotland before moving to Manchester United in 1919. He made his Football League debut on 15 November 1919 in a 1–0 loss at Burnley and remained at Old Trafford for two years, scoring 10 goals in 42 appearances.

In November 1921, he transferred to Wolverhampton Wanderers, where he made his debut on 3 December 1921 in a 2–0 win at Port Vale. He remained a first choice player for the remainder of the season, scoring nine times in 29 games. However, the appointment of George Jobey as manager during the 1922–23 season saw Bissett's opportunities decline and he featured only sporadically in that campaign.

He left to join Welsh League club Pontypridd in January 1924, but moved to Southend United four months later before retiring in 1926. He died in 1946.

References

External links
MUFCInfo.com profile

1896 births
1946 deaths
Scottish footballers
English Football League players
Manchester United F.C. players
Wolverhampton Wanderers F.C. players
Southend United F.C. players
Third Lanark A.C. players
People from Cowdenbeath
Footballers from Fife
Pontypridd F.C. players
Association football forwards
Scottish Football League players
Scottish Junior Football Association players
Glencraig Celtic F.C. players